DanChurchAid is a Danish humanitarian non governmental organisation aimed at supporting the world's poorest. It was founded in 1922, and is rooted in the Danish National Evangelical Lutheran Church. It is a member of ACT Development - a global alliance of over 140 churches and related humanitarian organisations, working to create positive and sustainable change in the lives of poor and marginalized people.

DanChurchAid's stated aim is to "assist the world’s poorest to lead a life in dignity, regardless of race, creed, political or religious affiliation.".

Since 2014, the Secretary General of DanChurchAid has been Birgitte Qvist-Sørensen. In 2017 it had a total income of DKK 691.5 million, including 91.6 million in EU grants.

History and purpose

Formation in 1922: Church aid in Europe 
In the aftermath of World War I, evangelical churches in 22 European countries met to discuss how churches could aid the rebuilding of Europe. Several smaller churches in war torn countries were dependent on external help to survive, and in light of that a European church alliance was formed. DanChurchAid - at that time named »Den danske Folkekirkes Nødhjælp til Europas Evangeliske kirker« - became the Danish branch of the alliance.

World War II: Refugee aid 
After World War II, DanChurchAid began to focus on aiding war refugees. The organisation became part of the Lutheran World Federation and the World Council of Churches, and were now able to help refugees from outside of Europe as well as within.

The engagement in international refugee and disaster relief aid, led to the organisation adopting its current Danish name, in 1953.

1960 to present day: Catastrophe relief aid, humanitarian aid, and developmental aid 
In the 1960s, DanChurchAid primarily worked with catastrophe relief and humanitarian aid. During the Biafra war in Nigeria, the organisation coordinated and led the Biafran airlift - a shared effort from church and humanitarian organisations to bring aid to children in Biafra. The airlift completed roughly 5,000 night flights.

The 1970s became the decade where DanChurchAid started working with developmental aid for the first time.

Since 1980, DanChurchAid has increasingly begun to focus on the political reasons behind poverty and emergency relief aid. During the Apartheid conflict in South Africa, the organisation invited Desmond Tutu to Denmark. He encouraged the Danish government to boycot the import of coal from South Africa. That became the start of a larger political pressure, which in 1985 led then Foreign minister Uffe Ellemann-Jensen to stop the import of coal from South Africa along with other goods.

In 2010 DanChurchAid became a part of ACT Alliance - an alliance composed of over 140 churches and related humanitarian organisations, working in over 120 countries.

Work and results 
DanChurchAid works in 25 countries across the world, with regional offices in Africa, Asia and the Middle East. The countries include:

Europe:

Denmark (Headquarters)

Africa:

Burundi
Central African Republic
Democratic Republic of Congo
Ethiopia
Kenya
Libya
Malawi
Sudan
South Sudan
Uganda
Zambia
Zimbabwe
Mali

Asia:

 Bangladesh
 Cambodia
 Laos
 Myanmar
 Nepal
 Pakistan
 Thailand

Middle East:

 Jordan
 Lebanon
 Palestine
 Syria

In 2017, DanChurchAid spent DKK 577.7 million on developmental and catastrophe relief aid across all countries. 8.2% of the total income was spent on administration costs.

Secretary Generals 
 2014–current: Birgitte Qvist-Sørensen
 2005–2014: Henrik Stubkjær
 2002–2005: 
 1992–2002: Christian Balslev-Olesen

Notes and references

External links
 DanChurchAid

Religious organizations based in Denmark
Poverty-related organizations